Methylbismuth dichloride is the organobismuth compound with the formula CH3BiCl2. It is a pale yellow solid.  The compound can be prepared in two steps from diphenylbismuth chloride, first by methylation with methylmagnesium chloride. Treatment of the resulting methyldiphenylbismuthine with hydrogen chloride cleaves the two phenyl-bismuth bonds. 

The compound adopts a polymeric structure wherein each square pyramidal Bi center is bound to four chloride ligands and an apical methyl group.  The bismuth centers are interconnected by doubly bridged chloride centers.

References

Organobismuth compounds
Chloro complexes